This is a list of postage stamps issued by the India Post between 2010 and 2014.

2010

2011

2012

2013

2014

See also 
 List of postage stamps of India
 List of Miniature Sheets from India Post
 Postage stamps and postal history of India

References

External links 
 India 2010 stamps
 Indian Postage Stamps
 Stamps of the World Wiki Catalog
 Welcome to the World of Indian Philately

Postage stamps of India
India2010